Omer Younas (born April 14, 1988 in Faisalabad, Pakistan) is a Pakistani racing driver who drove in Formula BMW Asia for Team E-Rain.

He has competed in a number of other racing series in Asia and is trying to get his B racing licence.

Career results

External links
RacingPakistan.com | Official Racing Pakistan Web Site
2007 Profile

 BMW Profile

1988 births
Living people
Pakistani racing drivers